Suchodoły may refer to the following places:
Suchodoły, Krasnystaw County in Lublin Voivodeship (east Poland)
Suchodoły, Kraśnik County in Lublin Voivodeship (east Poland)
Suchodoły, Podlaskie Voivodeship (north-east Poland)
Suchodoły, Łódź Voivodeship (central Poland)
Suchodoły, Gmina Kętrzyn in Warmian-Masurian Voivodeship (north Poland)
Suchodoły, Gmina Srokowo in Warmian-Masurian Voivodeship (north Poland)